

Menu & locations

Tossed is a UK fast food chain providing healthy food, fresh-made to order.  At the start of 2022 it has 12 outlets, all in central London.  

Tossed operates under the strapline of "food to make you feel good", offering a range of salads, wraps, hot food, smoothies, juices and protein shakes, as well as a breakfast range featuring freshly made eggs and vegan porridge.  

As well as providing food-to-go in its central London stores, Tossed also provides vending machines to satellite locations, including several London hospitals, under the brand speedygreens.

History

Tossed founder Vincent Mckevitt opened his first branch in Sheldon Square in Paddington, London in 2005.

In March 2016, Tossed announced that they would become the first UK chain not to accept cash.

In March 2018, Tossed announced they had bought the Vital ingredient chain.

In July 2020, during the first lockdown for COVID19 in central London, Zest Food, the company trading as both Tossed and Vital Ingredient, filed a notice of intention to appoint administrators.  Prior to the pandemic, it had been trading from 20 stores across the two brands. 

In September 2020, it was announced that the Tossed brand and six of its stores had been acquired by Neil Sebba and Angelina Harrisson.

References

External links

Restaurants established in 2005
2005 establishments in England